Alf Rhea (Tony) O'Rear (February 25, 1923 – May 4, 2018) was an American politician in the state of Tennessee. O'Rear served in the Tennessee House of Representatives from 1967 to 1968. A Democrat, he represented the 5th district (Hamilton County, Tennessee) and worked as a lawyer.

References

1923 births
2018 deaths
Members of the Tennessee House of Representatives